Xiphophorus is a genus of euryhaline and freshwater fishes in the family Poeciliidae of order Cyprinodontiformes, native to Mexico and northern Central America. The many Xiphophorus species are all known as platyfish (or platies) and swordtails. Platyfish formerly were classified in another genus, Platypoecilia, which is now obsolete. The type species is X. hellerii, the green swordtail.  Like most other new world Poeciliids, platies and swordtails are  live-bearers that use internal fertilization and give birth to live young instead of laying eggs like the bulk of the world's fishes. The name Xiphophorus derives from the Greek words ξίφος (dagger) and φόρος (bearer), referring to the gonopodium on the males. All are relatively small fishes, which reach a maximum length of  depending on the exact species involved.

Distribution and conservation status

The various Xiphophorus species range from the southern Rio Grande basin in Mexico, through eastern drainages in the country (river basins draining into the Gulf of Mexico), to northern Guatemala, Belize and northern Honduras.

Three species and their hybrids are common in the aquarium trade: the green swordtail (X. hellerii), the southern platyfish (X. maculatus) and the variable platyfish (X. variatus). These three are the only species that have large native ranges. They have also been introduced outside their native range (both in Mexico, Central America and other continents) where they sometimes become invasive species that outcompete and endanger native species, including other, more localized members of Xiphophorus.

All other species of Xiphophorus are highly localized and mostly endemic to Mexico. Only three of the localized species, the Chiapas swordtail (X. alvarezi), X. mayae and X. signum, range outside Mexico and the last two are the only Xiphophorus species not found in Mexico at all. In many locations there are two sympatric species, but the localized species are mostly (though not entirely) separated from each other, even when they are restricted to the same river basin. This includes three restricted species in the Rio Grande basin (all fully separated), nine restricted species in the Pánuco River basin (mostly separated) and three restricted species in the Coatzacoalcos River basin (mostly separated).

The International Union for Conservation of Nature (IUCN) lists the spiketail platyfish (X. andersi) and northern platyfish (X. gordoni) as Endangered, while the Monterrey platyfish (X. couchianus) and marbled swordtail (X. meyeri) are listed as Extinct in the wild, and thus only survive in captivity. In addition to those, Mexican authorities recognize the yellow swordtail (X. clemenciae) and Catemaco platyfish (Xiphophorus milleri) as threatened. Almost all the Xiphophorus, including the rare species, have captive populations that are maintained as "insurance" populations at breeding centers and by dedicated private aquarists.

Human uses

Xiphophorus species are regularly used in genetic studies, and scientists have developed many interspecific hybrids, especially in melanoma research since the 1920s. The Xiphophorus Genetic stock center, founded by Myron Gordon in 1939, is an important source of these fish for research.

In addition, several species are commonly kept by aquarium hobbyists, especially the green swordtail (X. helleri), southern platyfish (X. maculatus), and variable platyfish (X. variatus). In fact, these three species comprise one of the most prominent groups of aquarium species, being part of a group of extremely hardy livebearing fish, alongside the molly and guppy, that can adjust to a wide range of conditions within the aquarium. Unlike some species, these are almost always offered as captive bred individuals due to the ease of breeding these livebearers.

In captivity, they will coexist with many other fish species, although in an aquarium with too many males and not enough females, fighting can ensue between males of the same species. They can also easily jump out of an inadequately covered aquarium.

Species and taxonomy 

There are currently 28 recognized species in this genus, according to FishBase. Two of these species, X. clemenciae and X. monticolus, are likely the result of natural hybrid speciation (ancestors of both are a platy species and a swordtail species). Two other proposed species, X. kosszanderi and X. roseni, are recognized by FishBase, but not by all other authorities, as the first appears to be a hybrid between X. variatus and X. xiphidium, and the second between X. variatus and X. couchianus  (X. kosszanderi and X. roseni have not undergone speciation as in X. clemenciae and X. monticolus). Otherwise hybridization in the wild is uncommon in this genus and only known from three or four locations, despite the fact that many sites have two sympatric species.

Although traditionally divided into swordtails and platies, this separation is not supported by phylogenetic studies, which have shown that the swordtails are paraphyletic compared with the platies. These studies suggest that the genus can be divided into three monophyletic groups: the northern swordtails (of the Pánuco River basin, marked with a star* in the list), southern swordtails (southern Mexico to Honduras) and the platies. The common names given to individual species in this genus do not always reflect their actual relationships; for example, the marbled swordtail (X. meyeri) is actually in the platy group based on its genetics while the short-sword platyfish (X. continens) is closer to the swordtails.

Swordtails (Xiphophorus)
 Xiphophorus alvarezi D. E. Rosen, 1960 (Chiapas swordtail)
 Xiphophorus birchmanni* Lechner & Radda, 1987 (sheepshead swordtail)
 Xiphophorus clemenciae Álvarez, 1959 (yellow swordtail)
 Xiphophorus continens* Rauchengerger, Kallman & Morizot, 1990 (short-sword platyfish)
 Xiphophorus cortezi* D. E. Rosen, 1960 (delicate swordtail)
 Xiphophorus hellerii Heckel, 1848 (green swordtail)
 Xiphophorus kallmani M. K. Meyer & Schartl, 2003
 Xiphophorus malinche* Rauchengerger, Kallman & Morizot, 1990 (highland swordtail)
 Xiphophorus mayae M. K. Meyer & Schartl, 2002
 Xiphophorus mixei Kallman, Walter, Morizot & Kazianis, 2004 (Mixe swordtail)
 Xiphophorus montezumae* D. S. Jordan & Snyder, 1899 (Montezuma swordtail)
 Xiphophorus monticolus Kallman, Walter, Morizot & Kazianis, 2004 (southern mountain swordtail)
 Xiphophorus multilineatus* Rauchengerger, Kallman & Morizot, 1990
 Xiphophorus nezahualcoyotl* Rauchengerger, Kallman & Morizot, 1990 (mountain swordtail)
 Xiphophorus nigrensis* D. E. Rosen, 1960 (Panuco swordtail)
 Xiphophorus pygmaeus* C. L. Hubbs & Gordon, 1943 (pygmy swordtail)
 Xiphophorus signum D. E. Rosen & Kallman, 1969

Platies (Platypoecilus)
 Xiphophorus andersi M. K. Meyer & Schartl, 1980 (spiketail platyfish)
 Xiphophorus couchianus (Girard, 1859) (Monterrey platyfish)
 Xiphophorus evelynae D. E. Rosen, 1960 (Puebla platyfish)
 Xiphophorus gordoni R. R. Miller & W. L. Minckley, 1963 (northern platyfish)
 Xiphophorus kosszanderi M. K. Meyer & Wischnath, 1981 – often not recognized as a valid species, as likely a hybrid
 Xiphophorus maculatus (Günther, 1866) (southern platyfish)
 Xiphophorus meyeri Schartl & Schröder, 1988 (marbled swordtail)
 Xiphophorus milleri D. E. Rosen, 1960 (Catemaco platyfish)
 Xiphophorus roseni M. K. Meyer & Wischnath, 1981 – often not recognized as a valid species, as likely a hybrid
 Xiphophorus variatus (Meek, 1904) (variable platyfish)
 Xiphophorus xiphidium (Gordon, 1932) (swordtail platyfish)

References

External links
 xiphophorus genetic stock center
 xiphophorus.org
 xiphophorus.net(Chinese ver.)

 
Ovoviviparous fish
Freshwater fish genera
Taxa named by Johann Jakob Heckel
Ray-finned fish genera
Poeciliidae